Euaesthetus is a genus of beetles belonging to the family Staphylinidae.

The genus was first described by Johann Ludwig Christian Gravenhorst in 1806.

The genus has cosmopolitan distribution.

Species:
 Euaesthetus bipunctatus
 Euaesthetus laeviusculus
 Euaesthetus ruficapillus

References

Staphylinidae